Stavros Moutaftsidis (born 22 November 1947) is a Greek athlete. He competed in the men's hammer throw at the 1972 Summer Olympics.

References

External links
 

1947 births
Living people
Athletes (track and field) at the 1972 Summer Olympics
Greek male hammer throwers
Olympic athletes of Greece
Place of birth missing (living people)
20th-century Greek people